Magliophis is a genus of snakes of the family Colubridae.

Distribution
The 2 species of this genus are found in Puerto Rico, the United States Virgin Islands and the British Virgin Islands.

Species
 Magliophis exiguus (Cope, 1863) - Virgin Islands miniracer, ground snake
 Magliophis stahli (Stejneger, 1904) - Puerto Rican miniracer

References 

Magliophis
Snakes of the Caribbean